The women's 400 metres event at the 2002 African Championships in Athletics was held in Radès, Tunisia on August 7–8.

Medalists

Results

Heats

Final

References

2002 African Championships in Athletics
400 metres at the African Championships in Athletics
2002 in women's athletics